John Richard Worthington Poole-Hughes (8 August 1916 – 25 October 1988) was a Bishop of South-West Tanganyika and a Bishop of Llandaff.

Educated at Uppingham School and Hertford College, Oxford after wartime service with the Royal Artillery he was ordained in 1948. After a curacy at St Michael and All Angels, Aberystwyth he served as a missionary in East Africa  rising to the rank of diocesan Bishop in Tanzania. After serving as Assistant Bishop and as curate of Llantwit Major he was appointed to succeed Eryl Thomas as Bishop of Llandaff in 1975 and enthroned in the following year.

Notes

Anglican bishops of South-West Tanganyika
Bishops of Llandaff
Anglican missionaries in Tanzania
1916 births
People educated at Uppingham School
Alumni of Hertford College, Oxford
Welsh Anglican missionaries
1988 deaths
20th-century Anglican bishops in Tanzania
20th-century bishops of the Church in Wales
British Army personnel of World War II
Royal Artillery personnel
Burials in Wales